The Tramontana is a Spanish single or twin-seat sports car with styling inspired by open wheel racing cars. It is built by Advanced Design Tramontana in Palau de Santa Eulalia, Girona, Catalonia (Spain), and costs €500,000 or more. It was launched as a concept at the 2005 Geneva Motor Show, and subsequently modified for production.

It features a mid-mounted twin turbocharged Mercedes-Benz 5.5 litre, single overhead cam V12 engine producing . The body and interior are a mix of aluminium and carbon fibre, while the twenty-inch wheels are a mix of carbon fibre and magnesium. 

The car weighs  and the suspension is an adjustable double wishbone suspension. If the two seat option is chosen, the passenger sits directly behind and slightly higher than the driver. The bonnet badge is made of solid white gold.

Only 12 a year are manufactured. In 2009, Tramontana introduced a closed top model named Tramontana R.

References

External links
Official Tramontana web site

Car brands
Sports cars
Cars of Spain
Motor vehicle manufacturers of Spain
Companies based in Catalonia